Bellavista is a town in northern Peru, capital of the province Bellavista in the region San Martín. There are 22,116 inhabitants, according to the 2007 census

References

External links
Satellite map at Maplandia

Populated places in the San Martín Region